Winners

The Nandi Award for Best Dialogue Writer winners since 1983:

References 

Dialogue Writer
Screenwriting awards for film